Norman Smith (born 25 February 1982 in Kimberley, Northern Cape) is a South African footballer who played two periods for Premier Soccer League club Golden Arrows. He has three caps for the South Africa national soccer team.

External links
 

1982 births
Living people
Sportspeople from Kimberley, Northern Cape
Cape Coloureds
South African soccer players
Association football forwards
Lamontville Golden Arrows F.C. players
Thanda Royal Zulu F.C. players
SuperSport United F.C. players
Maritzburg United F.C. players
Jomo Cosmos F.C. players
South Africa international soccer players
South African Premier Division players
National First Division players